The Trigonidiidae are a family of crickets: Grylloidea consisting of two subfamilies:
 Subfamily  Nemobiinae Saussure, 1877 – wood crickets or ground crickets
 Subfamily  Trigonidiinae Saussure, 1874 – sword-tail crickets

References

 
Orthoptera families
Ensifera